Millwood is a historic plantation house and historic district on the east bank of the Black Warrior River, southwest of Greensboro, Alabama, USA.  The house was built in 1830.  It also served as a river hotel in the mid to late 19th century.  The property was added to the National Register of Historic Places on September 26, 1989, due to its architectural and historical significance.

References

National Register of Historic Places in Hale County, Alabama
Houses on the National Register of Historic Places in Alabama
Houses in Hale County, Alabama
Houses completed in 1830
Plantation houses in Alabama
Historic districts in Hale County, Alabama
1830 establishments in Alabama
Historic districts on the National Register of Historic Places in Alabama